Sir Condor Louis Laucke,  (9 November 1914 – 30 July 1993) was an Australian Liberal Party politician who served in both the South Australian House of Assembly and the Federal Senate, before becoming Lieutenant-Governor of South Australia.

Early life
Condor Laucke was the youngest son of a German immigrant, Friedrich Laucke, who had migrated to South Australia from Bremen in 1895. In 1899, his father established Laucke Mills at Greenock in South Australia's Barossa Valley. Laucke was educated at Immanuel College and the School of Mines in Adelaide, and after graduating, joined the family business, becoming Director and General Manager of what was now a large milling and stock feed enterprise in 1947.

State politics
Laucke was elected to the South Australian House of Assembly in the 1956 election, representing the Electoral district of Barossa as part of Sir Thomas Playford's Liberal and Country League government. He was re-elected in 1959 and 1962, and from 1962 to 1965 served as Government Whip and was regarded by colleagues as a potential future leader of the Liberal and Country League. However Laucke lost his seat to Labor candidate Molly Byrne in the 1965 election which swept the Liberal and Country League from office after 32 years in government—an election campaign in which Barossa, where northern Adelaide urban sprawl was overflowing into an otherwise rural and conservative electorate, was particularly targeted by Labor.

Federal politics

Laucke then moved into Federal politics, being appointed as a Senator for South Australia to fill the vacancy left by the death of Senator Clive Hannaford, his term beginning on 2 November 1967. He represented South Australia until 1981, being re-elected in 1967, 1974 and 1975, and was President of the Australian Senate from 17 February 1976 until 30 June 1981.

Other activities
In 1974, Laucke was one of the founding members of the Barons of Barossa, an organisation formed to promote the Barossa Valley and its winemaking and grape growing industries, to preserve its heritage, traditions and standards, and to carry out philanthropic works.

On 30 December 1978, Laucke was made a Knight Commander of the Order of St Michael and St George "for Services to the Parliament of Australia."

After retiring from the Federal Parliament, Laucke acted as Lieutenant Governor of South Australia from July 1982 to April 1992, during which time he performed the role of Governor for more than 300 days, while Governor Sir Donald Dunstan was either ill, out of the state or visiting remote areas.

References

 

1914 births
1993 deaths
Liberal Party of Australia members of the Parliament of Australia
Presidents of the Australian Senate
Members of the Australian Senate for South Australia
Members of the Australian Senate
Members of the South Australian House of Assembly
Australian Knights Commander of the Order of St Michael and St George
Australian politicians awarded knighthoods
Liberal Party of Australia members of the Parliament of South Australia
Liberal and Country League politicians
20th-century Australian politicians
Australian people of German descent
Australian Lutherans
Lieutenant-Governors of South Australia
People educated at Immanuel College, Adelaide